Ted Schroeder defeated Jaroslav Drobný in the final, 3–6, 6–0, 6–3, 4–6, 6–4 to win the gentlemen's singles tennis title at the 1949 Wimbledon Championships. Bob Falkenburg was the defending champion, but lost in the quarterfinals to John Bromwich.

Seeds

  Ted Schroeder (champion)
  Pancho Gonzales (fourth round)
  Frank Parker (quarterfinals)
  Bob Falkenburg (quarterfinals)
  John Bromwich (semifinals)
  Jaroslav Drobný (final)
  Eric Sturgess (semifinals)
  Frank Sedgman (quarterfinals)

Draw

Finals

Top half

Section 1

Section 2

Section 3

Section 4

Bottom half

Section 5

Section 6

Section 7

Section 8

References

External links

Men's Singles
Wimbledon Championship by year – Men's singles